Deuri Parbaha (also: Perbaha) is a village development committee in Dhanusa District in the Janakpur Zone of south-eastern Nepal. At the time of the 1991 Nepal census it had a population of 3,633 persons living in 652 individual households.

Transport

Deuri Parbaha is served by Perbaha railway station of Nepal Railways.

References

External links
UN map of the municipalities of Dhanusa District

 Populated places in Dhanusha District